Morella was a rural locality within Longreach Region, Queensland, Australia. Since January 2019, it has been amalgamated into the locality of Longreach.

Geography 
The Landsborough Highway passed from south-east to north-west through the locality.

History
Morella railway station on the Central Western railway line was named by the Queensland Railways Department on 7 August 1925. It is an Aboriginal word meaning small hill.

Morella Post Office opened on 1 July 1927 and closed in 1979.

Local women formed the Morella branch of the Queensland Country Women's Association in October 1944. Initially they met at the Hereward and Tandara homesteads. About September 1951 they opened their own hall.

Evesham State School opened on 23 January 1967. It was mothballed on 31 December 2009 and then permanently closed on 31 December 2010. The school was on Silsoe Road. The school's website was archived.

In January 2019, it was decided to reduce the number of localities within Longreach Region by amalgamating the localities to the north and west of the town of Longreach into the locality of Longreach. The localities amalgamated were: Camoola, Chorregon, Ernestina, Maneroo, Morella, Tocal, and Vergemont. As a consequence of this amalgamation, the Longreach Region has only three localities: Longreach, Ilframcombe and Isisford.

Heritage listings

Morella had a number of heritage-listed sites, including:

 Darr River Downs; Landsborough Highway

Amenities 

There was a branch of the Queensland Country Women's Association in Morella off Morella Road.

References

Further reading

External links 

 Map showing Morella before the 2019 amalgamation (archived on 28 July 2019)

Longreach Region